The Afghanistan–Tajikistan border is  in length and runs from the tripoint with Uzbekistan in the west to the tripoint with China in the east, almost entirely along the Amu Darya, Pyanj and Pamir rivers, except for the easternmost section along the Wakhan Corridor.

Description
The border begins in the west at the tripoint with Uzbekistan on the Amu Darya. It continues along the thalweg of this river, which flows in a broadly eastwards direction, until it reaches the junction with the Vakhsh River. The boundary follows the Pamir for  eastwards as far as Lake Zorkul (Sir-i-kol). The boundary then goes overland for  up to the Chinese tripoint, mainly following various mountain peaks and ridges. The border's eastern terminus is found at the Afghanistan-China-Tajikistan tripoint on Povalo-Shveikovskogo Peak / Kokrash Kol Peak (Kekelaqukaole Peak).

Much of the boundary is paralleled by Tajikistan's Pamir Highway.

History
The border was inherited from the old Soviet Union-Afghan border, which largely took its current shape during the 19th century Anglo-Russian rivalry in Central Asia, known as the Great Game. With the Russian Empire having conquered the Khanate of Khiva and the Emirate of Bukhara, and with the British Empire controlling the British Raj, the two powers agreed to leave Afghanistan as an independent buffer state between them.

In 1873 Britain and Russia agreed on a rough formulation of the border, with the Amu Darya declared to be the border going east from the vicinity of the village of Khwaja Salar to Lake Zorku, with the Wakhan Corridor to remain in Afghanistan. The western section of the border (i.e. the bulk of the modern Afghan-Turkmen boundary) was to be determined at a later date by a boundary commission.

Tensions mounted as the Russians expanded further into what is now Turkmenistan in the early 1880s, reaching a crisis with the Panjdeh incident (near Sandykachi in what is now Turkmenistan), an area claimed by Afghanistan. Discussions calmed the situation and a joint Anglo-Russian boundary commission demarcated the boundary as it is today over the period 1884–87. As the village of Khwaja Salar could no longer be identified it was agreed that the boundary should meet the Amu Darya in the vicinity of Khamiab, Afghanistan.

The easternmost section of the border (now forming part of the Afghan-Tajik boundary) was not finally delimited until 1893–95, with the Afghans agreeing to waive any claims to lands north the Amu Darya. This agreement also stipulated the position of the land border in section east of Lake Zorkul up to China, with a series of boundary pillars subsequently erected.

In 1921 a Soviet-Afghan treaty was signed whereby Russia agreed “to hand over to Afghanistan the frontier districts which belonged to the latter in the last century, observing the principles of justice and self-determination of the population inhabiting the same." However this treaty was never implemented, and was explicitly annulled by the Frontier Agreement of 1946, which kept the boundary as it was, with riverine islands to be subsequently allocated by a joint commission.

The border area was extremely volatile in the 1990s due to the Tajikistan Civil War and the Afghan Civil War. Security has improved since the end of the Tajik war and the fall of the Taliban government in 2001, however the long, porous frontier remains poorly policed and is a major drug smuggling route. There have also been a number of incidents related to the ongoing Taliban insurgency in Afghanistan. Russia formerly assisted with policing it prior to 2005, and there have been recent reports that China may now be assisting with border policing. Several new border crossing and bridges have built in recent years in an effort to boost trade and transportation links, partly funded by foreign governments and the Aga Khan Development Network.

In July 2021, many Afghan troops and civilians ran across the border after the Taliban troops took control of many areas. In response, the Tajik government put more Tajik troops around the border area.

Border crossings

 Shir Khan Bandar – Panji Poyon (road, see Tajik–Afghan bridge at Panji Poyon)
 Shighnan-Khorugh (road, see Tajik–Afghan bridge at Tem-Demogan)
 Ishkashim-Ishkoshim (road)
 Kokul – Ai Khanoum (ferry only)
 Tajik–Afghan Friendship Bridge

Settlements near the border

Afghanistan
 Baghri Kol
 Kolukh Teppe
 Sher Khan Bandar
 Shah Ravan
 Chichkeh
 Dasht-e-Qaleh
 Kvahan
 Khosfav
 Arakhat
 Ishkashim

Tajikistan
 Ayvadzh
 Panji Poyon
 Dusty
 Panj
 Parkhar
 Kishti Royen
 Qal'ai Khumb
 Kevron
 Rushon
 Bazhdu Pavdiv
 Khorugh
 Ishkoshim
 Sinib

History maps
Historical English-language maps of the Afghanistan-Tajik SSR border, mid to late 20th century:

See also
 Afghanistan–Tajikistan relations
 Extreme points of Afghanistan
 Extreme points of Tajikistan
 Sarikol Range

References

Further reading

 International Boundary Study No. 26 (Revised) – September 15, 1983 Afghanistan – U.S.S.R. Boundary

 
Great Game
International borders
Tajikistan
Borders of Tajikistan
Tajikistan